Karp is a surname. Notable people with the surname include:

Alex Karp, CEO of Palantir Technologies
Algo Kärp (born 1985), Estonian cross-country skier
Barrie Karp (born 1945), American philosopher and visual artist
Bob Karp (1911–1975), American comics writer
Brad S. Karp (born 1960), American litigator
Brad Karp, American computer scientist
Carol Karp (1926–1972), American mathematician, professor at the University of Maryland
Cary Karp (born 1947), Swedish museum curator
David Karp (disambiguation)
Edmund Karp (1913–2000), Estonian footballer
Eliane Karp (born 1955), French–Peruvian anthropologist and economist
Gail Karp (born 1955), Jewish-American cantor
Guido Karp (born 1963), German music photographer
Harvey Karp (born 1951), American pediatrician
Jensen Karp (born 1983), American art dealer, producer, podcaster and former rapper
Kobi Karp (born 1962), American. architect
Lila Karp (1933–2008), American activist, writer, teacher and feminist
Marcelle Karp (born 1964), U.S. feminist writer and director, pen name Betty Boob
Natalia Karp (1911–2007), pianist and Holocaust survivor
Raine Karp (born 1939), Estonian architect
Richard M. Karp (born 1935), American computer scientist
Robert Karp (1911–1975), American comics writer
Ryan Karp (born 1970), American baseball player
Sophia Karp (1861–1904), Romanian-born Jewish actress and soprano
Stephen R. Karp (born 1941), American real estate developer
Tal Karp (born 1981), female Australian footballer
Tom Karp (born 1946), American tennis player
Theodore Cyrus Karp (born 1926), American musicologist
Walter Karp (1934–1989), American writer and historian

See also
 Franz Samuel Karpe (1747-1806), Slovenian philosopher
 Henry C. Karpen (c.1868–1936), New York assemblyman

Jewish surnames